The Ambassador of the United Kingdom to Bolivia is the United Kingdom's foremost diplomatic representative in the Plurinational State of Bolivia, and head of the UK's diplomatic mission in La Paz.

Early diplomats
 1837–1842: Belford Hinton Wilson Chargé d'Affaires.
 1842–1848: William Pitt Adams Chargé d'Affaires.
 1848–1851: Hon. Frederick Bruce Chargé d'Affaires (Consul-General from 1847).
 1851–1853: John Augustus Lloyd Chargé d'Affaires and Consul-General.

Diplomatic relations were suspended in October 1853. 

Bolivia was combined with Peru until 1910.

 1874–1884: Spenser St. John, Minister Resident and Consul-General.
 1882–1884: Alfred St John, Acting Consul-General at Lima.
 1884–1894: Charles Edward Mansfield, Minister Resident at Lima.
 1894–1898: Henry Michael Jones, Minister Resident at Lima.
 1898–1908: William Nelthorpe Beauclerk, Minister Resident and Consul-General in Bolivia, 1903; Envoy Extraordinary and Minister Plenipotentiary to the Republics of Bolivia, Ecuador and Peru, 1906.

Ministers to Bolivia, 1910–1947
The following were Envoy Extraordinary and Minister Plenipotentiary to Bolivia:
 1910–1915: Cecil Gosling
 1919–1924: William Edmund O'Reilly
 1926–1930: Robert Michell
 1931–1934: Richard Nosworthy
 1934–1937: Thomas Joseph Morris
 1937–1939: Evelyn Rawlins
 1939–1940: Gordon Vereker
 1940–1943: James Dodds
 1943–1947: T. Ifor Rees

Ambassadors
 1947–1949: T. Ifor Rees
 1949–1956: Sir John Lomax
 1956–1960: Sir James Henderson
 1960–1964: Gilbert Holliday
 1964–1967: Sir Herbert Gamble
 1967–1971: Ronald William Bailey
 1971–1973: John Tahourdin
 1973–1977: Ronald Hope-Jones
 1977–1981: Adrian Buxton
 1981–1985: Stanley Duncan
 1985–1987: Alan White
 1987–1989: Colum John Sharkey
 1989–1991: Michael Daly
 1991–1995: Mike Jackson
 1995–1998: David Ridgway
 1998–2001: Graham Minter
 2001–2005: William Sinton
 2005–2007: Peter Bateman
 2007–2011: Nigel Baker
 2011–2015: Ross Denny
 2016–2018: James Thornton

 2019–: Jeff Glekin

References

External links
UK and Bolivia, gov.uk

Bolivia
 
United Kingdom